The gens Betiliena was a Roman family known from the early decades of the imperial era.  It is known chiefly from two individuals.  Betilienus Bassus was triumvir monetalis in the reign of Augustus, and is probably the same man who was later put to death by order of Caligula in AD 40.  Lucius Betilienus Varus was an architect, who built an aqueduct and several public buildings at Aletrium, a city in Latium, where the gens may have originated.

See also
 List of Roman gentes

References

Roman gentes